A second screen involves the use of a computing device to provide a different viewing experience for content on another device.  

The term commonly refers to the use of such devices to provide interactive features, like posts on social media platforms that take input from the audience during a broadcast, such as a television program. This type of technology is designed to keep the audience engaged with whatever they are watching. and has been found to support social television and generate an online conversation around specific content. It is a type of screen casting technology that allows a smartphone or tablet to display its contents on another screen. A second screen can also refer to having multiple monitors connected to a computer.

Analysis 
Several studies show a clear tendency to use a device while watching television. They also show a greater frequency of tablet and smartphone usage when watching television. Other studies distinguish a higher percentage of comments or posts on social networks about the content that is being watched (Nielsen ratings). Other studies show new user behaviours when consuming content via multiple devices. Hay-at & Samuel-Azran (2017) have demonstrated the interplay between using devices while watching television and online political discourse.

Besides the benefits of keeping the audience engaged in multiple ways (polling, chatting, background information about content and participants, etc.) and generating revenue via advertising, a second screen can be an effective metering solution to get information about the audience. Being more far-reaching and inexpensive, a second screen may replace people meters in the future.

One trend hampering the growth of second screens is that many shows are creating their own applications for them. It is considered impractical to expect users to download multiple applications and switch between them for each channel or show.

Conference and business meeting organizers are now incorporating second screens to deepen audience engagement. According to "2014 Trend Tracker", the second screen phenomenon is a significant and growing trend. "Attendees are so glued to their devices, even while watching a live presentation (or at home, on television) that marketers are supplying them with a simultaneous engagement tool they can access on that device," says Robin Stanley, VP-design and creative at GES. Software tools allow conference session presenters to share slides and presentations in real-time, so attendees can follow on with their device in hand." Second screen technology at conferences transforms the attendees' personal devices into an integral part of the event experience and turns conference attendees from passive listeners into active followers who engage with the speaker and other participants.

Applications 

Many applications designed for the second screen give another form of interactivity to the user and another way to sell advertising content. Second screening may also involve applications not formally connected to the primary entertainment. Some examples include:
 TV programs broadcasting live tweets and comments
 Synchronization of audio-visual content via web advertising
 Applications that extend the content information
 Shows that add content exclusively for the second screen to their websites
 Applications that synchronize the content being viewed to the mobile device
 Video game consoles playing with extra data, such as map or strategy data, that synchronize with the content being viewed on the portable device, such as the Wii U
 TV discovery application with recommendations, electronic programming guides (live content), and personalization
 Applications that display polling results and audience-triggered animated emoticons (along with the sender's name and location) in real-time on the broadcast instead of the user's second screen
Voting functionality for audiences at home via the broadcaster app

Sports broadcasting 
Sports broadcasters, to stem the flight of the TV the audience away from watching the main screen (the new name for the television) to the second screen, are offering alternative content to the main program. The idea is to present content related to the main program, like unseen moments, alternative information, soundtracks, and characters. Proposed new technologies allow the viewer to see different camera angles while watching the game.

TV2 (Denmark), Denmark's largest commercial TV channel, synchronized its Second Screen service with the live broadcast of the Giro d'Italia cycling race from May 5 to May 27, 2012. Viewers on all internet devices could get rider stats, biographies, news, stage reviews, city information, weather updates, and more. Viewers scanned a QR code on the TV broadcast to get connected or typed in a short URL.

In the US, HDNet Fights utilizes a second screen service that synchronizes with live MMA broadcasts. Viewers on smartphones and tablets can get stats, vote on fights and rounds, chat, win prizes, and see how fellow second screen users voted on fight outcomes.

Examples

See also 
 Enhanced TV
 Smart TV
 Automatic content recognition

References

Sources 
 Hayat, T., & Samuel-Azran, T. (2017). “You too, Second Screeners?” Second Screeners’ Echo Chambers During the 2016 US Elections Primaries. Journal of Broadcasting & Electronic Media, 61(2), 291–308.

Further reading 
 Revolutionizing your Television Experience with the Second Screen
 Decrypting the Second Screen Market: a second screen white paper

External links 
 5 ways that the television industry uses Twitter.
 Yap TV.
 From television to the second screen.
 TV and social networking closer.
 Twitter CEO on Second Social Screen TV.
 TV with other electronic devices.
 Second Screen Networks.
 Social Yume Study.
 Ares Interactive Media, World First Second Screen scalable cloudbase application.
 Annotated bibliography on tablet and touchscreen computing

Television technology
Television terminology
Video game gameplay